Just like Heaven is a 2005 American romantic comedy fantasy-adventure film directed by Mark Waters, starring Reese Witherspoon, Mark Ruffalo, and Jon Heder. It is based on the 1999 French novel If Only It Were True (Et si c'était vrai...) by Marc Levy.

Steven Spielberg obtained the rights to produce the film from the book. The film was released in the United States on September 16, 2005. It received mixed reviews from critics and grossed $102 million.

Plot
Elizabeth Masterson, an emergency room physician in San Francisco whose work is everything, is in a car accident while on her way to a blind date at her sister's. Three months later, landscape architect David Abbott, needing a fresh start after his wife's death, takes a sublet on Elizabeth's apartment.

Elizabeth begins to appear in the apartment, and both are confused. She thinks he's a squatter, and he thinks she broke in. They soon realize she moves through walls and objects. Elizabeth doesn't know who she is, and insists she's not dead. David unsuccessfully tries to have her spirit exorcised.

David enlists the help of a psychic bookstore clerk, Darryl, who says Elizabeth isn't really dead. He also tells David he's clearly got a blocked heart, and needs to let go of the woman who was previously in his life. When Elizabeth says David should get over being dumped, he storms out, and Darryl tells Elizabeth to not disrespect the dead. She finds David and he explains about his wife.

As only David can see and hear her, others think he is hallucinating and talking to himself. Elizabeth asks him to help her discover who she really is. David talks to her neighbours but they didn't know her.

Checking a restaurant she recognizes, a man has a medical emergency, so Elizabeth helps David save his life. Suddenly, she remembers being a doctor, and they go to the nearest hospital, where it all comes flooding back. Dr. Fran, her mentor, takes him to Elizabeth,  who is in a coma. When David touches her hand, Elizabeth feels it, meaning she's still connected to her body.

Elizabeth's sister Abby arrives, and Dr. Brett notifies her that Elizabeth signed a DNR order. He asks Abby to sign off on disconnecting life support, and she says she'll consider it.

David and Elizabeth bond. When he takes her to a beautiful landscaped garden he designed, she tells him she senses she has been there before. In fact, she was dreaming of the garden (in the opening scenes of the film), while cat-napping during a long shift.

When David's told he's been offered a long term lease, he realises Elizabeth will be taken off life support. He tries to prevent it by going to Abby's to tell her that Elizabeth is communicating with him. While there, her niece Lily can see Elizabeth.

David begs Abby to keep her alive, but she has already signed the papers, with life support ending the next day. As a last ditch effort, David blurts out Abby's secret from her wedding day, freaking her out so she drives him out of her house.

Elizabeth opts to spend her last night with David in the apartment. The next morning, he is determined to prevent her death by stealing her body from the hospital. He enlists his friend/therapist Jack to help. It turns out Jack is Abby's former college boyfriend, and the two had setup David and Elizabeth for the blind date with Elizabeth for the night of the accident; David can see Elizabeth because they were meant to meet. He admits to Jack and Elizabeth that he loves her.

Security guards catch them trying to steal Elizabeth's body. As they pull Jack away from her, her breathing tube comes off. Elizabeth is now dying, and David frantically kisses her body, while her spirit fades away. Her heartbeat returns and she awakens from the coma. Elizabeth recognizes Abby, but not David, and he sadly leaves.

Sometime later, Elizabeth moves back into her apartment. Drawn to the roof, she finds David, who has transformed it into a landscaped garden. He reveals he'd gotten in using the spare key her spirit had shown him. When she asks for her key back, their hands touch, her memory of the events during her coma are restored, and they kiss happily.

The final scene fades away from the rooftop to show Darryl staring into a snow globe, happy with "seeing" how things have turned out.

Cast

Reception

Critical response
 

Roger Ebert, Richard Roeper, and A. O. Scott all gave it favorable reviews, agreeing that the plot had logical flaws that were somewhat overcome by good dialogue and characterization.

Box office
Just like Heaven grossed $48.3 million in the United States and Canada, and $54.5 million in other territories, for a worldwide total of $102.9 million, against a budget of $58 million.

Theme song
The title of this film is also that of a popular 1987 song, "Just Like Heaven" by The Cure. Singer Katie Melua recorded a cover version of the song for the soundtrack of the film. Melua's version is played over the opening titles, and has lines such as "she said" changed to "he said" to maintain a heterosexual narrative. The original version by The Cure, as well as the remainder of Melua's version, are played over the closing credits.

The orchestral score was written by Rolfe Kent, and orchestrated by Tony Blondal.

Soundtrack

See also
Always (1989 film)
Endukante... Premanta!
Ghost (1990 film)
Ghost Town
Soulmates
Vismayathumbathu (2004)

References

External links

 
 
 
 

2000s fantasy comedy films
2000s ghost films
2005 romantic comedy films
2000s romantic fantasy films
2005 films
American fantasy comedy films
American ghost films
American romantic comedy films
American romantic fantasy films
DreamWorks Pictures films
Films about death
Films based on fantasy novels
Films based on French novels
Films based on romance novels
Films directed by Mark Waters
Films set in San Francisco
Films shot in San Francisco
Films set in hospitals
Films with screenplays by Leslie Dixon
Films with screenplays by Peter Tolan
Films scored by Rolfe Kent
Films produced by Walter F. Parkes
2000s English-language films
2000s American films